Terrimonas terrae is a Gram-negative, aerobic, rod-shaped and non-motile  bacterium from the genus of Terrimonas which has been isolated from the rhizosphere of a tomato plant from Buyeo-gun in Korea.

References

External links
Type strain of Terrimonas terrae at BacDive -  the Bacterial Diversity Metadatabase

Chitinophagia
Bacteria described in 2017